Valov (masculine, Bulgarian: Вълов, Russian: Валов) or Valova (feminine, Bulgarian: Вълова, Russian: Валова) is a Slavic surname. Notable people with the surname include:
Dimitar Valov (born 1949), Bulgarian rower
Elena Valova (born 1963), Russian pair skater 
Iliya Valov (born 1961), Bulgarian footballer and manager
Ivan Valov (born 1941), Bulgarian sprint canoeist
Lenka Valová (born 1983), Czech cyclist 
Lucie Valová (born 1981), Czech sport shooter
Jana Vaľová (born 1965), Slovak politician 
Irma Valová (born 1965), Czech basketball player 
Valya Valova-Demireva (born 1961), Bulgarian sprinter

References

Russian-language surnames
Czech-language surnames
Bulgarian-language surnames